Immaculate Conception Cathedral School (ICSS) is a private Catholic school in the heart of the historic Central Gardens neighborhood of Memphis, Tennessee. ICCS is co-educational and serves students of all faiths in its Pre-K3 through 8th grade.

Background
Founded in 1921 by the Sisters of Mercy, ICCS shares the campus of the Cathedral of the Immaculate Conception, the mother church of the Diocese of Memphis and is accredited by the Southern Association of Colleges and Schools as a unit school. Grades Pre-K through 8th are co-ed.

In August 2016, the school opened a new early childhood center that connects to the existing lower school building. The building also includes a library/media center and art room for all grades.

ICCS became only one of two schools in the Memphis area that incorporates "Mindfulness" into the Pre-K through high school curriculum. Intensive Spanish language instruction begins in Pre-K and continues through high school. Students can also choose French foreign language instruction in middle and high school. Other programs include STEM underwater and land-roving robotics teams, Orff music instruction, daily foreign language courses in all grades, and Accelerated Reader. 

High school students had the opportunity to earn college credit through Christian Brothers University. For some science honors courses, high school students attended classes alongside college students at Christian Brothers University in the Cooper-Wilson Center for Life Sciences.

Closure of high school 
On May 26, 2020, Immaculate Conception Cathedral School issued a news release to ABC Local 24 on its closure due to the COVID-19 pandemic. This statement was made by Bishop Robert W. Marshall Jr. The school would not reopen for the fall semester but the pre-K through 8th grade elementary and middle school would remain open. 

The statement described how the global pandemic caused financial difficulties that made it "impossible for the parish of the Cathedral of the Immaculate Conception to continue to operate the high school portion" of the school. Students had the opportunity to transfer to Saint Benedict at Auburndale, another diocesan high school.

Notable alumni

Priscilla Presley
Margaret Scobey, former United States Ambassador to Egypt and Syria.

References

External links
 School Website
 
 IC In the News 

1921 establishments in Tennessee
Educational institutions established in 1921
Girls' schools in Tennessee

Private elementary schools in Tennessee
Private middle schools in Tennessee
Private K–8 schools in the United States
Private K-12 schools in Tennessee
Roman Catholic Diocese of Memphis
Catholic secondary schools in Tennessee
Schools in Memphis, Tennessee